Hans Christian Holte (born 11 March 1965) is a Norwegian civil servant.

Having graduated as cand.polit. in political science from the University of Oslo in 1992, he became head of department in the Norwegian Directorate for Health and Social Affairs in 2002 and deputy under-secretary of state in the Ministry of Education and Research. He also served as assisting permanent under-secretary of state. From 2008 to 2013 he was the director of the Agency for Public Management and eGovernment, and from 2013 he is Tax Director in the Norwegian Tax Administration.

References

1965 births
Living people
University of Oslo alumni
Norwegian civil servants
Directors of government agencies of Norway